Safaa Khemis Association Football, known as Safaa El-Khemis or simply SKAF for a short, is an Algerian football club based in Khemis Miliana. The club was founded in 1936 and its colours are red and white. Their home stadium, Mohamed Belkebir Stadium, has a capacity of 8,000 spectators. The club is currently playing in Algerian Ligue 2. 

On August 5, 2020, SKAF Khemis Miliana promoted to the Algerian Ligue 2.

References

External links
Team profil – ligue-dz.com

Football clubs in Algeria
Aïn Defla Province
Association football clubs established in 1936
1936 establishments in Algeria
Sports clubs in Algeria